Michael L. Brodman, M.D. is an American gynecologist and obstetrician and currently the Ellen and Howard C. Katz Professor and Chairman of the Department of Obstetrics, Gynecology and Reproductive Science at Mount Sinai Hospital, Mount Sinai Health System, and Icahn School of Medicine at Mount Sinai in New York City. He is recognized internationally as a pioneer in the field of urogynecology.

Brodman is a Board Examiner for the American Board of Obstetrics and Gynecology, and has been a member of both the Council on Resident Education in Obstetrics and Gynecology and the Association of Professors in Obstetrics and Gynecology. He has twice received Council and Association Awards for Teaching Excellence in Obstetrics and Gynecology.

Brodman has been the Principal or co-investigator on 19 grants and has published multiple book chapters and abstracts. He appeared in the documentary film, The Business of Being Born, in 2008.

Biography
Brodman received his B.S. from Rutgers College of Engineering in New Brunswick, New Jersey in 1975. He earned his M.S. from the University of South Carolina's College of Engineering in 1977, and his M.D. from Mount Sinai School of Medicine in 1982. His post-doctoral training included a residency and a fellowship in pelvic surgery at Mount Sinai.

Brodman is involved in several global health initiatives and serves on the board of the International Organization for Women and Development, an organization that performs fistula repair surgery in Niger.

Honors and awards
1974 	Tau Beta Pi, National Engineering Honor Society
1974 	Pi Mu Epsilon, National Electrical Engineering Honor Society
1975 	Rutgers College of Engineering Slade Scholar Award for Independent Research
1975	Who's Who in American Colleges and Universities
1977 	Eta Kappa Nu, National Mathematics Honor Society
1986 	Administrative Chief Resident Award, Department of Obstetrics, Gynecology and Reproductive Science, Mount Sinai Hospital, New York, NY
1988 	Teacher of the Year Award, Department of Obstetrics, Gynecology and Reproductive Science, Mount Sinai School of Medicine, New York, NY
1992 	Association of Professors in Gynecology and Obstetrics for Outstanding Achievement in the Area of Resident Teaching and Education
1993 	Best Poster Presentation, "Operating room personnel morbidity from CO2 laser use during preceptored surgery", M. Brodman et al.  The Council for Resident Education in Obstetrics and Gynecology
1993 	Teacher of the Year Award, Department of Obstetrics, Gynecology and Reproductive Science, Mount Sinai School of Medicine, New York, NY
2002 	Teacher of the Year Award, Department of Obstetrics, Gynecology and Reproductive Science, Mount Sinai School of Medicine, New York, NY
2005	Physician of the Year Award, Mount Sinai Department of Nursing
2007 Alpha Omega Alpha, Honor Medical Society

Books and chapters
Partial list: 
Michael Brodman; Charles J Ascher-Walsh MD: "Acute Gynecologic Pain" Pediatric, Adolescent, & Young Adult Gynecology, Page: 347–357, 2009, 
Brodman M, Thacker J, Kranz R: Straight Talk About Sexually Transmitted Diseases, NY, Bascom Communications, 1993. 
Brodman M, Friedman F: Care of the critically ill obstetric patient, in Cherry S, Merkatz I (eds): Medical, Surgical and Gynecologic Complications of Pregnancy, Baltimore, MD, Williams and Wilkins, 1991, pp 1044 1054 (Chapter 64). ISSN 0342-4642
Flisser AJ, Brodman ML, and Nezhat F.  In Prevention and Management of Laparoendoscopic Complications. Kavic MS and Levinson CJ, eds.  Washington: Society of Laparoendoscopic Surgeons, 2004

Publications
Partial list:
Howell EA, Egorova NN, Janevic T, Brodman M, Balbierz A, Zeitlin J, Hebert PL. Race and Ethnicity, Medical Insurance, and Within-Hospital Severe Maternal Morbidity Disparities. Obstet Gynecol. 2020 Feb;135(2):285-293. doi: 10.1097/AOG.0000000000003667. PubMed ; PubMed Central PMCID: PMC711786
Friedman AM, Ananth CV, Lavery JA, Fleischer AA, Chazotte C, D'Alton ME; Safe Motherhood Initiative Venous Thromboembolism Work Group. Implementing Obstetric Venous Thromboembolism Protocols on a Statewide Basis: Results from New York State's Safe Motherhood Initiative. AmJ Perinatol. 2019 May;36(6):574-580. doi: 10.1055/s-0038-1668549. Epub 2018 Sep 13. PubMed 
Boodaie BD, Bui AH, Feldman DL, Brodman M, Shamamian P, Kaleya R, Rosenblatt M, Somerville D, Kischak P, Leitman IM. A perioperative care map improvesoutcomes in patients with morbid obesity undergoing major surgery. Surgery. 2018 Feb;163(2):450-456. doi: 10.1016/j.surg.2017.09.047. Epub 2017 Nov 28. PubMed 
Rhee AJ, Valentin-Salgado Y, Eshak D, Feldman D, Kischak P, Reich DL, LoPachin V, Brodman M. Team Training in the Perioperative Arena: A Methodology for Implementation and Auditing Behavior. Am J Med Qual. 2017 Jul/Aug;32(4):369-375. doi: 10.1177/1062860616662703. Epub 2016 Aug 10. PubMed

References

External links
The Mount Sinai Hospital homepage
Icahn School of Medicine at Mount Sinai homepage

American medical academics
American gynecologists
Living people
Icahn School of Medicine at Mount Sinai faculty
Icahn School of Medicine at Mount Sinai alumni
Rutgers University alumni
University of South Carolina alumni
Year of birth missing (living people)